Barabbas was a biblical figure.

Barabbas may also refer to:

Barabbas (1953 film), a Swedish film directed by Alf Sjöberg
Barabbas (1961 film), an American film directed by Richard Fleischer
Barabbas (2012 film), an Italian film directed by Roger Young
Barabbas (novel), a 1950 novel by Pär Lagerkvist
Barabbas (play), a 1928 play by Belgian dramatist Michel de Ghelderode
Barabbas, A Dream of the Word's Tragedy, an 1893 novel by English writer Marie Corelli

See also
Barabas (disambiguation)
Barrabas (disambiguation)
Bar-Abba (disambiguation)
Barabba, South Australia